Seeing Red is a 1983 American documentary film directed by Jim Klein and Julia Reichert. It was nominated for an Academy Award for Best Documentary Feature.

Synopsis
The documentary film looks at the political activities and activism of Americans who were members or supporters of the American Communist Party.  It is one of the first non-fiction films to examine the role of a third political party in the United States.

Reaction
In a mixed review, Dan Georgakas wrote in Cineaste that "given the failure of the interviewees to seize the opportunity offered by the filmmakers, seeing Red is unable to penetrate new ideological terrain or reconcile the radical generations. Nevertheless, the film provides a vivid sense of the public life of rank and file Communists of the 1930s and 1940s." In a negative review for The Nation, Joshua Freeman stated that "the effort is admirable but the results are disappointing. Neither the audience nor those interviewed are given their full due."

References

External links
 
 
 
 
 Seeing Red at New Day Films

1983 films
1983 documentary films
American documentary films
Black-and-white documentary films
Documentary films about American politics
Films about communism
Communism in the United States
American black-and-white films
1980s English-language films
1980s American films